Artúr Baján (4 April 1888 – 12 November 1969) was a Hungarian rower. He competed in the men's eight event at the 1912 Summer Olympics.

References

1888 births
1969 deaths
Hungarian male rowers
Olympic rowers of Hungary
Rowers at the 1912 Summer Olympics
People from Nova Gradiška